The Ireland women's national rugby union team represents Ireland in international women's rugby union competitions such as the Women's Six Nations Championship and the Women's Rugby World Cup. They have also represented Ireland in the FIRA Women's European Championship. Ireland won the 2013 and 2015 Women's Six Nations Championships. In 2013 they also achieved both a Triple Crown and Grand Slam. They finished fourth in the 2014 Women's Rugby World Cup after defeating New Zealand in the pool stages. Ireland hosted the 2017 Women's Rugby World Cup. The team was originally organised by the Irish Women's Rugby Football Union. However, since 2009 it has been organised by the Irish Rugby Football Union

History

Early years 
The Irish Women's Rugby Football Union was established in 1991. Ireland made their international debut on 14 February 1993 with an away friendly against .  This was also Scotland's first international. The match was played at Raeburn Place in front of a crowd of over 1,000. The Ireland team was coached by Alain Rolland while the Scotland coaches included Sandy Carmichael. Scotland won 10–0 with two tries from their captain, Sandra Colamartino. Ireland's first captain was Jill Henderson. A year later, on 13 February 1994, Ireland made their home international debut when a return match was played at Ravenhill. This time Scotland won 5–0. In 2001 the IWRFU became affiliated to the Irish Rugby Football Union, in 2008 it effectively merged with the IRFU and since 2009 the IRFU has managed the women's national team.

Rugby World Cup 
Ireland have competed in every Women's Rugby World Cup since making their debut in the second tournament in 1994. They made their World Cup debut on 13 April 1994 with an 18–5 win against a Scottish Students XV. This was also Ireland's first competitive match in any competition.

Ireland's best performance at a World Cup tournament came in 2014 when they finished fourth after defeating New Zealand and winning Pool B. After defeating the United States 23–17 in their opening pool game, Ireland faced New Zealand, the 2010 Women's Rugby World Cup winners in their second game. With tries from Heather O'Brien and Alison Miller and two conversions and a penalty from Niamh Briggs, Ireland defeated New Zealand 17–14. It was just the second match New Zealand had lost in a World Cup tournament. It was the first time the Ireland women had played New Zealand and they became only the second Irish team, after Munster in 1978, to defeat a New Zealand national rugby union team. The result has been described as "one of the biggest upsets in the tournament's history". Ireland subsequently qualified for the semi-finals with a 40–5 win against Kazakhstan.

They failed to qualify for the 2022 Rugby World Cup, after ending in third place of the qualifying round of September 2021 in Italy.

Six Nations Championship 

Ireland made their debut in the Women's Six Nations Championship, then known as the Women's Home Nations Championship, in the inaugural 1996 competition. They played their first game against  on 21 January 1996. During the 1990s and early 2000s, Ireland never challenged for the championship. They regularly finished in the wooden spoon position at the bottom of the table. Before winning their first championship in 2013, the highest position they ever finished in the competition was third. When Ireland returned in 2002, the competition became known as the Six Nations for the first time. Ireland won their first Six Nations match in 2005 when they defeated  11–6. Ireland defeated Scotland for the first time on 10 March 2007 with an 18–6 win at Meggetland. In 2009 Ireland defeated France for the first time.

Ireland won their first championship in 2013, winning both a Triple Crown and a Grand Slam at the same time. In their opening match of the campaign, Ireland beat  12–10. Then on 9 February 2013 they defeated  for the first time. Alison Miller scored a hat-trick of tries as Ireland won 25–0.  On 23 February 2013 they clinched their first Triple Crown with a 30–3 win against Scotland.
On 8 March 2013 Ireland effectively won the championship after they defeated France 15–10. It was confirmed the following day after  failed to defeat England. Ireland eventually finished four points clear of runners-up France. Ireland secured the Grand Slam with a 6–3 away win against Italy on Saint Patrick's Day. Two penalties from Niamh Briggs gave Ireland their fifth win in a row.

In 2015, Ireland won their second championship and second Triple Crown in three years. They won the championship on points difference over France, after both teams had won four of their five matches. Ireland had to win their final game, against Scotland, by a margin of 27 points or more to win the title and achieved this with a 73–3 win. The result is also Ireland's biggest ever win.

FIRA Women's European Championship 
Ireland has also competed in the FIRA Women's European Championship. They first played in the tournament in 1997. Their best performance in this tournament was a third-place finish in 2008.
In 2004 they won the Plate competition after defeating  20–12 in the final.

Players

Current squad 
38-player squad for 2022 Women's Six Nations Championship.

Records

World Cup

Overall 
See List of Ireland women's national rugby union team matches
Full internationals only
Correct as of 21 August 2022

Six Nations

Head coaches

Honours 
Women's Six Nations Championship
Winners: 2013, 2015
Grand Slam
Winners: 2013
Triple Crown
Winners: 2013, 2015
FIRA Women's European Championship Plate 
Winners: 2004

References 

 
European national women's rugby union teams
Women's rugby union in Ireland
1993 establishments in Ireland